Erwin Isak Jacob Rosenthal (18 September 1904 – 1991), was a German-born British Hebrew scholar and orientalist.

Early life
Erwin Isak Jacob Rosenthal was born in Heilbronn, Germany, on 18 September 1904 into a Jewish family. He was educated at the University of Heidelberg, and the University of Berlin where he studied History, Arabic, and Aramaic, and published his dissertation in 1932, and then with Leo Baeck, Hanokh Albeck, and Ismar Elbogen.

Career
In 1933, Rosenthal and his wife left Nazi Germany and moved to London, where he was appointed as a part-time lecturer in Hebrew and North Semitic Epigraphy at University College London, then Manchester, and later Cambridge.

Rosenthal became a Fellow of Pembroke College and a Reader in Oriental Studies at the University of Cambridge.

Selected publications
Political Thought in Medieval Islam (1958)
Judaism and Islam (Thomas Yoseloff, London, 1961)

Personal life
He married Elisabeth Charlotte Marx (1907–1996), and they had two children, Tom Rosenthal a publisher, and Miriam Hodgson, an editor of children's books.

References

1904 births
1991 deaths
Fellows of Pembroke College, Cambridge
Heidelberg University alumni
Humboldt University of Berlin alumni
Academics of the University of Cambridge
British orientalists
Jewish emigrants from Nazi Germany to the United Kingdom